Statistics of Czechoslovak First League in the 1956 season.

Overview
It was contested by 12 teams, and Dukla Prague won the championship. Milan Dvořák and Miroslav Wiecek were the league's top scorers with 15 goals each.

Stadia and locations

League standings

Results

Top goalscorers

References

Czechoslovakia - List of final tables (RSSSF)

Czechoslovak First League seasons
Czech
Czech
1
1